Freedom to farm was a phrase that was used in the United States congressional arena to characterize the production flexibility contract provisions of the 1996 farm bill (P.L. 104–127).

References 

United States Department of Agriculture